The Audi/Bentley 90° twin-turbocharged V8 racing engine is a 3.6-liter and 4.0-liter, twin-turbocharged, four-stroke, 90-degree, V8 racing engine, used in the Audi R8C, Audi R8R, Audi R8 and Bentley Speed 8 Le Mans Prototype race cars, between 1999 and 2005.

Audi R8C/R8R engine
While the R8R has a large number of vents placed on the nose, most of the intakes and air exits on the R8C are placed on the sides.

Audi R8 engine
The R8 is powered by a 3.6 L Audi V8 with Fuel Stratified Injection (FSI), which is a variation on the concept of gasoline direct injection developed by VW; it maximizes both power and fuel economy at the same time. FSI technology can be found in products available to the public, across all brands in the Volkswagen Group.

Unofficially, the works team Audi R8 for Le Mans (2000, 2001, and 2002) is said to have had around  instead of the quoted 610 hp.

Restrictor changes for 2003 brought the power down to 550 bhp for anyone still racing with the R8, but the maximum torque hardly changed.

For 2005, The ACO still felt that the R8 needed to be kept in check, so they reduced the restrictor size on the R8's engine, due to the car not meeting new hybrid regulations, and stipulated the car shall carry ballast weight in an attempt to make the races more competitive. The R8 was restricted even further to only 520 bhp.

Bentley Speed 8/EXP Speed 8 engine
The engine from the Audi R8, a 3.6-liter V8, with (Honeywell Turbo Technologies) turbocharger, was used as the initial powerplant for the Bentley in 2001.

Following its initial year of competition, the Audi-sourced V8 was modified to better suit the EXP Speed 8. This would ultimately lead to Bentley redesigning the car for 2003, leading to the change of name to simply Speed.

Applications
Audi R8C
Audi R8R
Audi R8
Bentley Speed 8

References

Volkswagen Group
V8 engines
Audi engines
Bentley engines
Volkswagen Group engines
Gasoline engines by model
Engines by model
Piston engines
Internal combustion engine